is a JR West railway station on the Kure Line, located in Kure, Hiroshima, Japan.

History
Opened as a station of the Japan National Railways on December 27, 1903
Lent to the Sanyo Railway on December 1, 1904.
Sanyo Railway was nationalized on December 1, 1906.
Started the reconstruction of the station on April 9, 1922.
Completed the reconstruction and started the operation on August 13, 1923.
Completely destroyed by fire in the Kure Air Raid on July 2, 1945.
Started the construction of the new building of the station in December 1945.
Finished the construction on April 30, 1946.
Held the opening ceremony on May 6, 1946.
Started the operation on May 7, 1946.
Opened the current station building on July 7, 1981.
Stopped the cargo service on November 1, 1986.
Privatized on April 1, 1987.
Redecorated the station building and named the building as "Crest" in 1997.

Station layout

Platforms

Adjacent stations

|-
!colspan=5|JR West

Connecting bus routes

Hiroden Bus

Chugoku JR Bus

Kure City Bus

Around the station
Kure Sogo
Yumetown Kure
Babcock-Hitachi K.K
Yamato Museum
Kure Port
Kure University - Kure Station Campus, Extension Center
Irifuneyama Park
Irifuneyama Kinenkan
Kure City Hall
Kure City Transportation Bureau
Kurealine
Kure Interchange

External links
 JR West station information 

Kure Line
Railway stations in Hiroshima Prefecture
Railway stations in Japan opened in 1903